Sanar-e Sofla (also Romanized as Sanār-e Soflá; also known as Sanār-e Pā’īn) is a village in Birun Bashm Rural District, Kelardasht District, Chalus County, Mazandaran Province, Iran. At the 2006 census, its population was 195, in 61 families.

References 

Populated places in Chalus County